General Sutter is a 1999 Swiss historical film directed by Benny Fasnacht and starring Werner Bachofen, Hannes Schmidhauser and Rahman Dalrymple. It is based on the life of John August Sutter, a German-born Swiss figure who participated in the American gold rush in the years after the American Civil War.

Selected cast
 Werner Bachofen – Young John Sutter
 Hannes Schmidhauser – General John A. Sutter
 Wolfram Berger – Frank Buchser
 Rahman Dalrymple – James Marshall

External links

1999 films
1990s biographical films
1990s historical films
Swiss biographical films
Swiss historical films
1990s German-language films
Films set in the 19th century
Films set in California